Hernán Gumy (born 5 March 1972) is a former tennis player from Argentina, who turned professional in 1991. He represented his native country at the 1996 Summer Olympics in Atlanta, Georgia, where he was defeated in the first round by Venezuela's Nicolas Pereira. Gumy made two finals in his career; both of them ATP 250s on clay in 1996. He won Santiago, Chile (his final tournament of 1996) by beating the Spanish World No. 15 Félix Mantilla in a tough three-setter: in the semi-finals, and the Chilean world number 11 Marcelo Ríos in the final 6–4, 7–5. He lost the other final he was in, in Oporto, Portugal to Spain's Félix Mantilla despite winning the first set.

The right-hander reached his highest singles ATP-ranking on 19 August 1996, when he became World No. 39. Gumy won the gold medal in the men's singles competition at the 1995 Pan American Games.

Coaching 
Gumy has been coaching Svetlana Kuznetsova.

Gumy has coached former World No. 1 and US and Australian Open champion Marat Safin as well as Guillermo Cañas and Ernests Gulbis.

ATP career finals

Singles: 2 (1 title, 1 runner-up)

ATP Challenger and ITF Futures Finals

Singles: 11 (6–5)

Doubles: 2 (0–2)

Performance timeline

Singles

References

External links 
 
 
 

1972 births
Argentine male tennis players
Argentine tennis coaches
Living people
Olympic tennis players of Argentina
Tennis players from Buenos Aires
Tennis players at the 1995 Pan American Games
Tennis players at the 1996 Summer Olympics
Pan American Games gold medalists for Argentina
Pan American Games medalists in tennis
Medalists at the 1995 Pan American Games
20th-century Argentine people